The Baojun E300 or Baojun Kiwi EV, is a battery electric city car manufactured by SAIC-GM-Wuling (SGMW) since 2017 under the Baojun brand. It is a four-seater car with two doors and a hatch at the rear.

History

SAIC-GM-Wuling showed the first pictures of the vehicle in the cubic design in December 2019. At that time, it was still announced as a new energy vehicle (NEV). The microcar had its public premiere in January 2020 in Guangxi. The E300 series has been sold in China since May 2020. In August 2021, the E300 was updated and relaunched as the Baojun KiWi EV.

The car is offered as a shorter E300 with two or three seats or as a longer E300 Plus with four seats.

Specifications

Suspension is a McPherson independent suspension and double wishbone independent suspension design.

Safety
Safety features include electronic stability control (ESC), the anti-lock braking system (ABS) with electronic brake-force distribution (EBD), hydraulic brake assist (HBA), and dual front air bags. More than 80% of the body consists of high-strength steel. The battery pack is wrapped in super-strong steel and is equipped with an active power-off system for an extra protection precaution in the event of a collision.

References

E300
Electric city cars
Cars introduced in 2020